Milic may refer to:

 Milić, a Serbian given name and surname, and Croatian surname
 Milič (disambiguation), including Milíč

See also
 Milicz